Buffalo Gap is an unincorporated community in Augusta County, Virginia, United States.

History 
Buffalo Gap experienced a boom when an iron furnace was built there by the Buffalo Gap Furnace Company. A town of about 70 houses, a railroad station, a post office, and several schools were built around the furnace in the coming years. In 1850, the Buffalo Gap Presbyterian Church was founded about a mile west of the church's current location.

The furnace was unsuccessful, leaving Buffalo Gap a ghost town. The town was taken over by the Buffalo Gap Development company, which aspired to make Buffalo Gap a thriving town again.

In 2004, the community was described as a "bedroom community" for nearby Staunton, where people could enjoy country life, but not have to travel far to get to a city.

As of 2004, the community had a population of "about 200 people".

References

Unincorporated communities in Virginia
Unincorporated communities in Augusta County, Virginia
Mountain passes of Virginia